is a city located in Miyagi Prefecture, Japan. , the city had an estimated population of 77,897 and a population density of 150 persons per km² in 27,298 households. The area is noted for its rice production.

Geography
Tome is in far northeastern Miyagi Prefecture, bordered by Iwate Prefecture to the north. The Kitakami River flows through the city. The city is approximately 70 kilometers north of the prefectural capital of Sendai.

Neighboring municipalities
Miyagi Prefecture
Ishinomaki
Kurihara
Ōsaki
Kesennuma
Wakuya
Minamisanriku
Iwate Prefecture
Ichinoseki

Climate
Tome has a humid climate (Köppen climate classification Cfa) characterized by mild summers and cold winters.

Demographics
Per Japanese census data, the population of Tome peaked in the 1950s and has declined steadily over the past 70 years.

History
The area of present-day Tome was part of ancient Mutsu Province, and has been settled since at least the Jōmon period by the Emishi people. During the later portion of the Heian period, the area was ruled by the Northern Fujiwara. During the Sengoku period, the area was contested by various samurai clans before the area came under the control of the Date clan of Sendai Domain during the Edo period, under the Tokugawa shogunate.

The town of Tome was established on June 1, 1889 within Tome District, Miyagi with the establishment of the modern municipalities system. The city of Tome was established on April 1, 2005, from the merger of the towns of Hasama, Ishikoshi, Minamikata, Nakada, Toyoma, Towa, Toyosato, Tsuyama, and Yoneyama (all from Tome District), and the town of Tsuyama (from Motoyoshi District). Tome District was dissolved as a result of his merger.

2011 earthquake and tsunami
Tome was one of several cities severely affected by an earthquake and tsunami on Friday, 11 March 2011, with as many as 6,000 people left homeless. On 15, 2011, authorities announced that German and Swiss teams with search dogs would be deployed to the city to aid in search and recovery efforts. Other search and rescue team came from Australia and New Zealand. Early reports suggest that many residents of the nearby town of Minamisanriku, which was one of the hardest hit by the tsunami, had evacuated to Tome.

Government
Tome has a mayor-council form of government with a directly elected mayor and a unicameral city legislature of 26 members. Tome contributes two seats to the Miyagi Prefectural legislature. In terms of national politics, the city is part of Miyagi 6th district of the lower house of the Diet of Japan.

Economy
The economy of Tome is largely based on agriculture.

Education
Tome has 21 public elementary schools, one combined public elementary/middle school, nine public junior high schools operated by the city government, and three public high schools operated by the Miyagi Prefectural Board of Education.

Transportation

Railway
 East Japan Railway Company (JR East) -  Tōhoku Main Line 
  -  - 
 East Japan Railway Company (JR East) - Kesennuma Line 
  -  -  -

Highway
: (Tsukidate and Wakayanagi interchanges)
: (Monou-Toyosato, Toyoma (Tome), Towa/Mitakido, and Monou-Tsuyama interchanges)

Local attractions

 Toyoma Education Museum
 Naganuma Futopia Park

Twin towns – sister cities

Tome is twinned with:
 Nyūzen, Japan
 Southlake, United States
 Vernon, Canada

Noted people from Tome 
Shotaro Ishinomori, manga artist
Katsuhiro Otomo, manga artist
Kouzou Sasaki, politician
Shio Satō, manga artist
Maruyama Gondazaemon, sumo
Shinobu Sugawara, Japanese professional wrestler

References

External links

Official Website 

 
Cities in Miyagi Prefecture